The Lutheran Hospital of Indiana, commonly known as Lutheran Hospital, is a medical facility in Fort Wayne, Indiana.

History
At the beginning of the 20th century, local Lutheran church leaders in Fort Wayne felt an urgent need for an additional hospital in the city. Led by Reverend Philip Wambsganss, they raised funds from the surrounding area, in 1904, the 25-bed Lutheran Hospital opened.

The hospital was sold in 1995, with the proceeds forming The Lutheran Foundation which continues promote community wellness through its support of regional organizations, churches, and schools.

Overview
Lutheran Hospital is a tertiary-care facility serving northeastern Indiana, northwestern Ohio and southern Michigan. Lutheran is the region's only heart and kidney transplant center. In addition, Lutheran Children's Hospital offers pediatric inpatient and intensive care units and the most pediatric subspecialties in the region. Lutheran Hospital added a fifth floor which opened in late 2011.

Lutheran Hospital is a member of the Lutheran Health Network, owned by Community Health Systems.

Services
Burn Center
Cardiac Intensive Care Unit
Cardiovascular Intensive Care Unit
Childbirth Suites & Neonatal
Intensive Care Unit
Critical Care Transport (Lutheran Air and Mobile Intensive Care Unit)
ECMO (adult)
ER (Level II Trauma)
Hyperbaric Medicine 
Indiana Wound Care Clinic
Inpatient and Outpatient Surgery
Interventional Stroke Care
Lutheran Cancer Center
Lutheran Cancer Resource Center
Lutheran Children's Hospital
Lutheran Health Network Bariatric Center
Lutheran Health Network Diabetes Services
Lutheran Heart Center
Neuro ICU
Nutrition Therapy
Outpatient Burn Clinic
Outpatient Rehabilitation
Radiology and Lab Services (including outpatient)
Sleep Disorders Center
Tobacco Intervention Program
Transplant Center- Heart 
Ventricular Assist Device implant (Destination Therapy & Bridge to Transplant)
 Weight Management Center

References

External links

Hospital buildings completed in 1904
Hospitals in Indiana
Christian hospitals
Buildings and structures in Fort Wayne, Indiana
Economy of Fort Wayne, Indiana
Community Health Systems
Trauma centers